Petros is the surname of:

 Abune Petros (1882–1936), Ethiopian bishop and martyr born Haile Maryam
 Amanal Petros (born 1995), German long-distance runner
 Beyene Petros (born 1950), Ethiopian biology professor and politician
 George Petros (born 1955), American art designer, author, editor, interviewer and illustrator
 Hanna Petros (1896–1958), Iraqi-Assyrian composer and scholar
 Tim Petros (1961–2020), Canadian football player
 Walatta Petros (1592–1642), Ethiopian saint